Cynoglossum is a genus of small-flowered plants in the family Boraginaceae (borage family).

Cynoglossum officinale, the common hound's-tongue, is a native of Asia, Africa, and Europe. It has been introduced into North America, and it is considered to be a troublesome weed because its burs stick to the wool of sheep and to other animals. Ingestion of this plant can also lead to photosensitivity in grazing animals.

Species
, there are 75 species in the genus:

References

 
Boraginaceae genera